Espangun (also Romanized as Espangūn; also known as Espangān and Espengān) is a village in Tiab Rural District, in the Central District of Minab County, Hormozgan Province, Iran. At the 2006 census, its population was 110, in 27 families.

References 

Populated places in Minab County